Gokina Rama Rao  is an Indian film, character actor, known for his works in Telugu cinema.

Awards
Nandi Awards
Nandi Award for Best Actor  - Punadhirallu (1979)

Selected filmography
Kaani 
2008 Ganapathi 
1999 Sultan 
1998 Kanyadanam 
1997 Preminchukundam Raa 
1995 Maya Bazaar 
1992 Antham 
1992 Prema Vijetha 
1991 Surya IPS 
1991 Naa Pellam Naa Ishtam
1990 Prema Khaidi as Bapineedu
1988 Praja Pratinidhi
1986 Driver Babu as Public Prosecutor
1984 Mangammagari Manavadu
1979 Punadhirallu
1979 President Peramma
1977 Chillara Kottu Chittemma
1973 Doctor Babu
1973 Manchi Vallaki Manchivadu

References

Indian male film actors
Telugu male actors
People from Nalgonda
20th-century Indian male actors
Nandi Award winners